Boško Prodanović (Serbian Cyrillic: Бошко Продановић; born 1 August 1943 in Otočac) is a  Yugoslav and Bosnian-Herzegovinian retired professional footballer.

Club career
He was a member of the FK Sarajevo squad that won the Yugoslav First League in the 1966–67 season, being part of a memorable attacking partnership with namesake Boško Antić. Prodanović also represented GNK Dinamo Zagreb and FK Radnički 1923.

International career
He played once for Yugoslavia, in a June 1968 friendly match against Brazil.

Honours

Player

Club
Sarajevo 
Yugoslav First League: 1966–67

References

External links

Boško Prodanović at footballdatabase.eu

1943 births
Living people
Footballers from Sarajevo
Serbs of Bosnia and Herzegovina
Association football forwards
Association football midfielders
Yugoslav footballers
Yugoslavia international footballers
GNK Dinamo Zagreb players
FK Sarajevo players
FK Radnički 1923 players
Yugoslav First League players
Yugoslav Second League players